Aarne (Arne) Eriksson (15 January 1916 – 1 August 1983) was a Finnish football referee. He was born in Jakobstad. He was a FIFA international referee from 1955 to 1958.

Eriksson is known for supervising one match in the 1958 World Cup and assisting another. Arne Eriksson along with Tapio Yli-Karro are the only Finnish referees appointed to the World Cup finals so far.

International matches

References

External links 
 
 
 

1916 births
1983 deaths
Finnish football referees
1958 FIFA World Cup referees
People from Jakobstad
Sportspeople from Ostrobothnia (region)